Terry Jones Jr. (born December 3, 1979) is a former American football tight end. He played four years at the University of Alabama, the alma mater of his father, Terry Jones Sr., who was a defensive tackle for the Green Bay Packers from 1978-84.  He was selected in fifth round, 155th overall by the Baltimore Ravens in the 2002 NFL Draft.

College career 
Jones started three years at the University of Alabama. He was chosen as team captain for his senior season, when he earned All-SEC honors after posting 10 catches for 115 yards and 2 touchdowns. He missed five games his junior season after tearing a ligament in his left knee.  He started as a true freshman. He has a degree in business from the University.

Professional career
Jones played in 14 games his rookie season, managing 1 touchdown and 11 catches in 14 games, and posted similar numbers over his 3 years overall in Baltimore, periodically picking up more game time when starter Todd Heap was sidelined with injuries.  He was waived by the Baltimore Ravens on November 12, 2005 after seeing no action with the team, where the San Francisco 49ers were awarded his rights off waivers on November 15, 2005 and Jones finished out 7 games.  He was re-signed after the season and ultimately waived in early September during the 2006 NFL season.  He was also a member of Team Alabama of the All American Football League.

References

External links
 http://goliath.ecnext.com/coms2/gi_0199-2042488/Nine-NFL-rookies-follow-dads.html
 http://sportsillustrated.cnn.com/football/2002/draft/players/10208.html
 https://web.archive.org/web/20141204215324/http://www.kffl.com/player/5624/nfl/news
 https://www.usatoday.com/sports/nfl/2002draft/tes/terryjones.htm

1979 births
Living people
Sportspeople from Tuscaloosa, Alabama
American football tight ends
Alabama Crimson Tide football players
Baltimore Ravens players
San Francisco 49ers players